Claudio Argento (born 15 September 1943) is an Italian film producer and screenwriter.  Most of the titles he has produced have been the horror films directed by his older brother, Dario Argento.  One major exception was Alejandro Jodorowsky's cult film Santa Sangre (1989); in addition to producing, Claudio Argento co-wrote the screenplay for the film.  Argento was an associate producer for George A. Romero's Dawn of the Dead (1978).

References

External links
 

1943 births
Living people
Italian film producers
20th-century Italian screenwriters
21st-century Italian screenwriters
Writers from Rome
Italian male screenwriters